Stéphanie Tirode (born 1 May 1975) is a French female sport shooter. At the 2012 Summer Olympics, she competed in the Women's 10 metre air pistol.

References

French female sport shooters
Living people
Olympic shooters of France
Shooters at the 2008 Summer Olympics
Shooters at the 2012 Summer Olympics
Shooters at the 2016 Summer Olympics
Shooters at the 2015 European Games
European Games competitors for France
1975 births
21st-century French women